The 1991 Appalachian State Mountaineers football team was an American football team that represented Appalachian State University as a member of the Southern Conference (SoCon) during the 1991 NCAA Division I-AA football season. In their third year under head coach Jerry Moore, the Mountaineers compiled an overall record of 8–4 with a conference mark of 5–1.

Schedule

References

Appalachian State
Appalachian State Mountaineers football seasons
Southern Conference football champion seasons
Appalachian State Mountaineers football